Following is a list of Zilla (district) schools in Bangladesh.  A zilla school may refer to a number of old schools in Bengal established during the British Raj 

 Barguna Zilla School – Barguna, Barisal Division
 Barishal/Barisal Zilla School – Barishal, Barisal Division
 Bogura/Bogra Zilla School – Bogura, Rajshahi Division
 Cumilla/Comilla Zilla School – Cumilla, Chittagong Division
 Dinajpur Zilla School – Dinajpur, Rangpur Division
 Faridpur Zilla School – Faridpur, Dhaka Division
 Jamalpur Zilla School – Jamalpur, Mymensingh Division
 Joshore/Jessore Zilla School – Jashore, Khulna Division 
 Khulna Zilla School – Khulna, Khulna Division
 Mymensingh Zilla School – Mymensingh, Mymensingh Division
 Naogaon Zilla School – Naogaon, Rajshahi Division
 Noakhali Zilla School – Maijdee, Chittagong Division
 Pabna Zilla School – Pabna, Rajshahi Division
 Rangpur Zilla School – Rangpur, Rangpur Division
 Kushtia Zilla School – Kushtia, Khulna Division
 Victoria Jubilee Government High School/ Chuadanga Zilla School – Chuadanga, Khulna Division
 Sherpur Government Victoria Academy – Sherpur District, Mymensingh Division

See also

 Education in Bangladesh
 History of education in the Indian subcontinent#Colonial era
 List of schools in Bangladesh

Zilla